Conformation generally means structural arrangement and may refer to:
 Conformational isomerism, a form of stereoisomerism in chemistry
 Carbohydrate conformation
 Cyclohexane conformation
 Protein conformation
 Conformation activity relationship between the biological activity and the conformation or conformational changes of a biomolecule

Animal breeding
Equine conformation evaluates the degree of correctness of a horse's bone structure, musculature, and body proportions
Conformation (dog) evaluates a dog according to physical standards for its breed
Conformation show, a dog show in which dogs are judged according to how well they conform to the established breed type

See also
Conformable
Conformal (disambiguation)
Conformality
Conformance (disambiguation)
Conformer
Confirmation
Conformity